The anterior median fissure of the spinal cord has an average depth of about 3 mm, but this is increased in the lower part of the spinal cord.

It contains a double fold of pia mater, and its floor is formed by a transverse band of white matter, the anterior white commissure, which is perforated by blood vessels on their way to or from the central part of the spinal cord.

The anterior median fissure provides a groove in which the anterior spinal artery sits. From here, it provides the anterior part of the spinal cord. It is sourced from the segmental medullary arteries and the segmental spinal arteries which are sourced from the intercostal arteries.

The anterior median fissure (AMF) may be identified on computerized tomography (CT) myelograms, but more commonly on magnetic resonance imaging (MRI) scans.  The AMF has a characteristic appearance on MRI scans that differs from the MRI appearance of the central canal.

Additional images

References

Tomsick T, Peak E, Wang L:  Fluid-Signal Structures in the Cervical Spinal Cord on MRI: Anterior Median Fissure vs. Central Canal. AJNR 2017; 38:840–45

Oichi Y, Hanakita J, Takahashi T, Minami M, Kawakoa T, et al.: Morphological patterns of the anterior median fissure in the cervical spinal cord evaluated by computed tomography after myelography. Neurospine 2018; 15:388-393

Tomsick T, Wang L, Zuccarello M, Ringer AJ.  Fluid-signal structures in the cervical spinal cord on MRI in Chiari patients: Central canal or anterior median fissure?  AJNR Am J Neuroradiol. 2021 Apr;42(4):801-806. doi: 10.3174/ajnr.A7046. Epub 2021 Mar 11.PMID: 33707286

External links
  - "Medulla Oblongata, Anterior View"

Spinal cord